Victorio Rubén Montalvo Rojas (born 8 December 1966) is a Mexican lawyer and politician affiliated with the Party of the Democratic Revolution. As of 2014 he served as Deputy of the LVII and LX Legislatures of the Mexican Congress representing the Federal District.

He served also as President of the Chamber of Deputies from 31 May to 31 August 1999.

References

1966 births
Living people
Politicians from Mexico City
Members of the Chamber of Deputies (Mexico)
Presidents of the Chamber of Deputies (Mexico)
Party of the Democratic Revolution politicians
21st-century Mexican politicians